The 1967–68 season of the Washington Britannica was their first season in the American Soccer League, and the club's first season in professional soccer.  The club was created in 1963 at the amateur level and fielded a team under the same name.  During their initial professional year, the team earned second place in the Southern Division.  The following year, the club folded the team and renamed themselves, fielding a new team for the 1968 season, the Washington Darts.

Background

Review

Competitions

ASL regular season

Results summaries

Results by round

Match reports

Statistics

Transfers

References 

Washington Darts seasons
Fort Lauderdale Strikers
Washing Washington, D.C.
Washing Washington, D.C.